Cyril Panther (born 6 June 1938 in Nigeria) was a Nigerian boxer.

Career
Panther moved to Great Britain from Nigeria on the advice of his manager and his first fight was a defeat to Willie Hart in 1962. Problems with his cataract led to him becoming blind. He finished his boxing career in 1972 after fighting on 45 occasions.

Personal life
His son is Scottish footballer Emmanuel Panther.

Notes

1938 births
Sportspeople with a vision impairment
Living people
Nigerian male boxers
Light-middleweight boxers